Varsity is a lost 1928 American comedy silent film directed by Frank Tuttle, written by Howard Estabrook, George Marion Jr. and Wells Root, and starring Charles "Buddy" Rogers, Mary Brian, Chester Conklin, Phillips Holmes, Robert Ellis and John Westwood. It was released on October 27, 1928, by Paramount Pictures.

Cast 
Charles "Buddy" Rogers as Jimmy Duffy
Mary Brian as Fay
Chester Conklin as Pop Conlan
Phillips Holmes as Middlebrook 
Robert Ellis as Rod Luke
John Westwood as The Senior

References

External links 
 
 
 Moving Picture World, Ad

1928 films
1920s English-language films
Silent American comedy films
1928 comedy films
Paramount Pictures films
Films directed by Frank Tuttle
Films set in universities and colleges
American black-and-white films
Lost American films
American silent feature films
1928 lost films
Lost comedy films
1920s American films